The Rally Hall of Fame is a hall of fame for famous rally drivers and other persons who have had a great influence on rallying. The exhibition is part of the automobile and road museum Mobilia located at Kangasala, near the city of Tampere, in central Finland.

The Hall of Fame was opened on 29 April 2010 with four inductees; Erik Carlsson, Paddy Hopkirk, Rauno Aaltonen and Timo Mäkinen. Walter Röhrl and Hannu Mikkola were elected in 2011, and Michèle Mouton and Carlos Sainz in 2012. New nominations are introduced every year during the Rally Finland.

The selections are made by an international committee led by AKK-Motorsport, Finland's representative in the Fédération Internationale de l'Automobile (FIA). In 2011, the selection committee consisted of five persons: Mouton, Kari O. Sohlberg (chairman of AKK), Neil Duncanson (owner of North One Television), Martin Holmes (motorsport journalist) and Pekka Honkanen (director of the Sports Museum Foundation of Finland).

Members

References

External links 
 Official website of Mobilia

Auto racing museums and halls of fame
Rallying
Halls of fame in Finland